Lazuri de Beiuș is a commune in Bihor County, Crișana, Romania with a population of 1,518 people. It is composed of four villages: Băleni (Balalény), Cusuiuș (Köszvényes), Hinchiriș (Henkeres) and Lazuri de Beiuș.

References

Communes in Bihor County
Localities in Crișana